The 2021–22 I liga (also known as Fortuna I liga due to sponsorship reasons) was the 74th season of the second tier domestic division in the Polish football league system since its establishment in 1949 and the 14th season of the Polish I liga under its current title. The league is operated by the PZPN.

The regular season was played as a round-robin tournament. A total of 18 teams participated, 14 of which competed in the league campaign during the previous season, while one to be relegated from the 2020–21 Ekstraklasa and the remaining three to be promoted from the 2020–21 II liga. The season started on 30 July 2021 and concluded on 22 May 2022. Each team played a total of 34 matches, half at home and half away.

Teams
A total of 18 teams participate in the 2021–22 I liga season.

Changes from last season
The following teams have changed division since the 2020–21 season.

To I liga

From I liga

Stadiums and locations

''Note: Table lists in alphabetical order.

 Due to the renovation of the Resovia Stadium in Rzeszów, Resovia will play their home games at Stadion Stal in Rzeszów. Originally they declared to play home matches at the Podkarpackie Centrum Piłki Nożnej in Stalowa Wola.
 ŁKS played its home games in a partially-completed stadium until the April 22 match against Chrobry Głogów, when the remainder of the stadium was officially opened for use. 
 In the first half of the 2021/2022 season Skra played every home match on the opponent's stadium, as the home team, because Municipal Football Stadium Loretańska in Częstochowa didn't meet the license requirements of the I liga. From April 16, 2022, they play their home games at a substitute stadium GIEKSA Arena. Originally they declared to play home matches at the Stadion Ludowy in Sosnowiec.

League table

Positions by round
Note: The place taken by the team that played fewer matches than the opponents was underlined.

Results

Results by round

Promotion play-offs
I liga play-offs for the 2021–22 season will be played on 26 and 29 May 2022. The teams who finished in 3rd, 4th, 5th and 6th place are set to compete. The fixtures are determined by final league position – 3rd team of regular season vs 6th team of regular season and 4th team of regular season vs 5th team of regular season. The winner of final match will be promoted to the Ekstraklasa for next season. All matches will be played in a stadiums of team which occupied higher position in regular season.

Matches

Semi-finals

Final

Season statistics

Top goalscorers

Attendances

Awards

Monthly awards

Player of the Month

Number of teams by region

See also
2021–22 Ekstraklasa
2021–22 II liga
2021–22 III liga
2021–22 Polish Cup
2021 Polish SuperCup

Notes

References

External link
 

I liga seasons
2021–22 in Polish football
Poland